The 1962–63 New York Rangers season was the franchise's 37th season. New York finished in fifth place in the NHL with 56 points and did not qualify for the playoffs.

Regular season

Final standings

Record vs. opponents

Schedule and results

|- align="center" bgcolor="#FFBBBB"
| 1 || 11 || Detroit Red Wings || 2–1 || 0–1–0
|- align="center" bgcolor="#FFBBBB"
| 2 || 13 || @ Montreal Canadiens || 6–3 || 0–2–0
|- align="center" bgcolor="#CCFFCC"
| 3 || 14 || Toronto Maple Leafs || 5–3 || 1–2–0
|- align="center" bgcolor="#FFBBBB"
| 4 || 17 || Chicago Black Hawks || 5–1 || 1–3–0
|- align="center" bgcolor="white"
| 5 || 21 || Montreal Canadiens || 3–3 || 1–3–1
|- align="center" bgcolor="#CCFFCC"
| 6 || 27 || @ Toronto Maple Leafs || 5–1 || 2–3–1
|- align="center" bgcolor="#FFBBBB"
| 7 || 28 || Chicago Black Hawks || 5–3 || 2–4–1
|- align="center" bgcolor="#FFBBBB"
| 8 || 30 || @ Chicago Black Hawks || 5–3 || 2–5–1
|-

|- align="center" bgcolor="#FFBBBB"
| 9 || 1 || @ Detroit Red Wings || 4–0 || 2–6–1
|- align="center" bgcolor="white"
| 10 || 3 || @ Montreal Canadiens || 3–3 || 2–6–2
|- align="center" bgcolor="#CCFFCC"
| 11 || 4 || @ Boston Bruins || 4–3 || 3–6–2
|- align="center" bgcolor="#FFBBBB"
| 12 || 7 || Toronto Maple Leafs || 5–1 || 3–7–2
|- align="center" bgcolor="#FFBBBB"
| 13 || 10 || @ Toronto Maple Leafs || 5–3 || 3–8–2
|- align="center" bgcolor="#FFBBBB"
| 14 || 11 || Detroit Red Wings || 3–2 || 3–9–2
|- align="center" bgcolor="#CCFFCC"
| 15 || 14 || Boston Bruins || 6–2 || 4–9–2
|- align="center" bgcolor="#FFBBBB"
| 16 || 17 || Chicago Black Hawks || 4–3 || 4–10–2
|- align="center" bgcolor="#CCFFCC"
| 17 || 18 || Toronto Maple Leafs || 3–1 || 5–10–2
|- align="center" bgcolor="#CCFFCC"
| 18 || 21 || Boston Bruins || 4–2 || 6–10–2
|- align="center" bgcolor="#CCFFCC"
| 19 || 22 || @ Boston Bruins || 7–1 || 7–10–2
|- align="center" bgcolor="#FFBBBB"
| 20 || 24 || @ Toronto Maple Leafs || 4–1 || 7–11–2
|- align="center" bgcolor="#FFBBBB"
| 21 || 25 || Montreal Canadiens || 3–1 || 7–12–2
|- align="center" bgcolor="#CCFFCC"
| 22 || 29 || @ Detroit Red Wings || 5–0 || 8–12–2
|-

|- align="center" bgcolor="#FFBBBB"
| 23 || 2 || @ Chicago Black Hawks || 5–1 || 8–13–2
|- align="center" bgcolor="white"
| 24 || 5 || Detroit Red Wings || 3–3 || 8–13–3
|- align="center" bgcolor="white"
| 25 || 8 || @ Boston Bruins || 3–3 || 8–13–4
|- align="center" bgcolor="#FFBBBB"
| 26 || 9 || Boston Bruins || 4–2 || 8–14–4
|- align="center" bgcolor="#FFBBBB"
| 27 || 12 || @ Chicago Black Hawks || 4–3 || 8–15–4
|- align="center" bgcolor="#FFBBBB"
| 28 || 13 || @ Detroit Red Wings || 3–2 || 8–16–4
|- align="center" bgcolor="#CCFFCC"
| 29 || 15 || @ Montreal Canadiens || 4–2 || 9–16–4
|- align="center" bgcolor="#CCFFCC"
| 30 || 16 || Detroit Red Wings || 5–2 || 10–16–4
|- align="center" bgcolor="#FFBBBB"
| 31 || 22 || @ Toronto Maple Leafs || 4–2 || 10–17–4
|- align="center" bgcolor="#FFBBBB"
| 32 || 23 || Chicago Black Hawks || 3–1 || 10–18–4
|- align="center" bgcolor="#FFBBBB"
| 33 || 25 || @ Boston Bruins || 6–2 || 10–19–4
|- align="center" bgcolor="#CCFFCC"
| 34 || 27 || Boston Bruins || 9–3 || 11–19–4
|- align="center" bgcolor="white"
| 35 || 30 || Montreal Canadiens || 4–4 || 11–19–5
|- align="center" bgcolor="white"
| 36 || 31 || @ Detroit Red Wings || 1–1 || 11–19–6
|-

|- align="center" bgcolor="#CCFFCC"
| 37 || 2 || Toronto Maple Leafs || 3–2 || 12–19–6
|- align="center" bgcolor="white"
| 38 || 5 || @ Montreal Canadiens || 2–2 || 12–19–7
|- align="center" bgcolor="#FFBBBB"
| 39 || 6 || Montreal Canadiens || 6–0 || 12–20–7
|- align="center" bgcolor="#FFBBBB"
| 40 || 12 || @ Chicago Black Hawks || 3–1 || 12–21–7
|- align="center" bgcolor="#FFBBBB"
| 41 || 13 || @ Detroit Red Wings || 4–2 || 12–22–7
|- align="center" bgcolor="#CCFFCC"
| 42 || 19 || @ Boston Bruins || 5–3 || 13–22–7
|- align="center" bgcolor="#FFBBBB"
| 43 || 20 || @ Chicago Black Hawks || 6–2 || 13–23–7
|- align="center" bgcolor="white"
| 44 || 23 || Chicago Black Hawks || 3–3 || 13–23–8
|- align="center" bgcolor="#CCFFCC"
| 45 || 26 || @ Montreal Canadiens || 4–2 || 14–23–8
|- align="center" bgcolor="#FFBBBB"
| 46 || 27 || Toronto Maple Leafs || 4–2 || 14–24–8
|- align="center" bgcolor="#FFBBBB"
| 47 || 30 || Detroit Red Wings || 6–1 || 14–25–8
|-

|- align="center" bgcolor="white"
| 48 || 2 || @ Toronto Maple Leafs || 2–2 || 14–25–9
|- align="center" bgcolor="#FFBBBB"
| 49 || 3 || Boston Bruins || 6–4 || 14–26–9
|- align="center" bgcolor="#CCFFCC"
| 50 || 6 || Montreal Canadiens || 6–3 || 15–26–9
|- align="center" bgcolor="white"
| 51 || 9 || Chicago Black Hawks || 3–3 || 15–26–10
|- align="center" bgcolor="#FFBBBB"
| 52 || 10 || @ Chicago Black Hawks || 4–2 || 15–27–10
|- align="center" bgcolor="#FFBBBB"
| 53 || 12 || @ Boston Bruins || 6–3 || 15–28–10
|- align="center" bgcolor="#FFBBBB"
| 54 || 16 || @ Toronto Maple Leafs || 4–2 || 15–29–10
|- align="center" bgcolor="#CCFFCC"
| 55 || 17 || Toronto Maple Leafs || 4–1 || 16–29–10
|- align="center" bgcolor="white"
| 56 || 20 || Boston Bruins || 3–3 || 16–29–11
|- align="center" bgcolor="#FFBBBB"
| 57 || 23 || @ Montreal Canadiens || 6–3 || 16–30–11
|- align="center" bgcolor="#FFBBBB"
| 58 || 24 || Detroit Red Wings || 3–2 || 16–31–11
|- align="center" bgcolor="#CCFFCC"
| 59 || 26 || @ Detroit Red Wings || 4–3 || 17–31–11
|- align="center" bgcolor="#CCFFCC"
| 60 || 28 || @ Chicago Black Hawks || 6–1 || 18–31–11
|-

|- align="center" bgcolor="#FFBBBB"
| 61 || 2 || @ Toronto Maple Leafs || 4–3 || 18–32–11
|- align="center" bgcolor="#FFBBBB"
| 62 || 3 || Detroit Red Wings || 3–2 || 18–33–11
|- align="center" bgcolor="#CCFFCC"
| 63 || 6 || Chicago Black Hawks || 5–2 || 19–33–11
|- align="center" bgcolor="#CCFFCC"
| 64 || 9 || @ Montreal Canadiens || 5–2 || 20–33–11
|- align="center" bgcolor="#FFBBBB"
| 65 || 10 || Montreal Canadiens || 5–1 || 20–34–11
|- align="center" bgcolor="#FFBBBB"
| 66 || 14 || @ Detroit Red Wings || 9–4 || 20–35–11
|- align="center" bgcolor="#FFBBBB"
| 67 || 17 || Toronto Maple Leafs || 2–1 || 20–36–11
|- align="center" bgcolor="#CCFFCC"
| 68 || 20 || Boston Bruins || 5–1 || 21–36–11
|- align="center" bgcolor="white"
| 69 || 21 || @ Boston Bruins || 2–2 || 21–36–12
|- align="center" bgcolor="#CCFFCC"
| 70 || 24 || Montreal Canadiens || 5–0 || 22–36–12
|-

Playoffs
The Rangers failed to qualify for the 1963 Stanley Cup playoffs.

Player statistics
Skaters

Goaltenders

†Denotes player spent time with another team before joining Rangers. Stats reflect time with Rangers only.
‡Traded mid-season. Stats reflect time with Rangers only.

Awards and records

Transactions

See also
1962–63 NHL season

References

New York Rangers seasons
New York Rangers
New York Rangers
New York Rangers
New York Rangers
Madison Square Garden
1960s in Manhattan